Paul Hubbard is an American football coach.  He served the head football coach at Bethany College in Lindsborg, Kansas from 2015 to 2018.

Playing career
Hubbard played for two years at Bethany as a defensive lineman in 2000 and 2001 for College Football Hall of Fame coach Ted Kessinger.  At Bethany he was named third team all-American by Don Hansen's Football Gazette.  After his sophomore year, he transferred to the University of Northern Colorado where he earned second team all-American from Sports Network and third team all-American by the Associated Press.  While at Northern Colorado, he led the nation with 16 1/2 sacks in 2003.

Coaching career
Hubbard has served as an assistant coach at Midland University and MidAmerica Nazarene University.  He was head coach at  Bethany College in Lindsborg, Kansas from 2015 through the conclusion of the 2018 season, when he resigned after compiling a record of 11–32 in four seasons.

Head coaching record

References

Year of birth missing (living people)
Living people
Bethany Swedes football coaches
Bethany Swedes football players
MidAmerica Nazarene Pioneers football coaches
Midland Warriors football coaches
Northern Colorado Bears football players